Nganga is a Kenyan and Congolese surname that may refer to:

Evelyne Nganga (born 1986), Kenyan long-distance runner
Kimani Nganga Maruge (c. 1920 – 2009), Kenyan Roman catholic

Surnames of Congolese origin
Kongo-language surnames
Surnames of Kenyan origin